My Little Pony: Equestria Girls (also known as My Little Pony: Equestria Girls – Magical Movie Night on home media release and My Little Pony: Equestria Girls – Tales of Canterlot High on Netflix) is a series of Flash animated television specials based on Hasbro's toyline and media franchise of the same name, which in turn is a spin-off of the 2010 relaunch of Hasbro's My Little Pony toyline. The series focuses on the main characters from the television series My Little Pony: Friendship Is Magic, re-envisioned as humans teenagers attending high school. A total of three 22-minute specials aired in the United States on Discovery Family from June 24 to July 8, 2017.

Premise
The three specials follow the daily lives and adventures of Canterlot High School's top students – Twilight Sparkle, Sunset Shimmer, Applejack, Fluttershy, Pinkie Pie, Rainbow Dash and Rarity – following the events of My Little Pony: Equestria Girls – Legend of Everfree.

Cast

Main Character Voices
 Tara Strong as Twilight Sparkle (speaking)
 Rebecca Shoichet as Twilight Sparkle (singing)
 Ashleigh Ball as Rainbow Dash & Applejack
 Andrea Libman as Pinkie Pie & Fluttershy
 Tabitha St. Germain as Rarity (speaking)
 Kazumi Evans as Rarity (singing)
 Cathy Weseluck as Spike
 Rebecca Shoichet as Sunset Shimmer

Supporting Character Voices (In Order of Appearance)
 Sharon Alexander as Sour Sweet
 Sienna Bohn as Sugarcoat
 Britt Irvin as Sunny Flare
 Shannon Chan-Kent as Lemon Zest
 Andy Toth as Canter Zoom
 Ali Liebert as Juniper Montage
 Kira Tozer as Chestnut Magnifico
 Charles Zuckerman as Stalwart Stallion
 Kelly Sheridan as Starlight Glimmer

Additional Voices
 Ashleigh Ball
 Andrea Libman
 Tabitha St. Germain
 Rebecca Shoichet
 Andy Toth
 Charles Zuckerman
 Kelly Sheridan

Specials

Other media

International release
The three specials had a weekly release in Poland on Teletoon+ from May 14 through May 28, 2017.

Home media
The three specials were released on a one-disc Region 1 DVD on August 8, 2017 by Shout! Factory under the title My Little Pony: Equestria Girls – Magical Movie Night. Under the title My Little Pony: Equestria Girls – Tales of Canterlot High, the specials were also made available on the Netflix video streaming service on October 1, 2017.

Reception
The Magical Movie Night compilation DVD release received mixed reviews, with criticism directed towards the DVD's lower visual and sound quality compared to previous films as well as the lack of extra content. Brett Nolan of NoReruns.net praised the DVD's presentation of the specials as a single film, saying it gave the specials "a much more cohesive and cinematic feel, lending itself beautifully to watching it straight through in one go." Joe Corey of Inside Pulse gave the specials an overall score of 4 out of 5, including his daughter's input that she "wasn't bothered that this wasn't one narrative such as the previous four movies". Classic Speedy of ToonZone called "Dance Magic" a "slight but fun story", while considering "Mirror Magic" to be the best of the three stories as a direct follow-up of the second special, and for its "unexpected" inclusion of Starlight Glimmer as a character. Conversely, Francis Rizzo III of DVD Talk, while giving the story content three out of five stars, drew unfavorable comparisons to Friendship Is Magic as he felt it contrasted the previous films' "sense of identity built around music and a quasi-magical backstory", considering the specials to be "more like a standard earthbound teen cartoon that eventually remembers that there are superpowers involved come the third episode".

References

My Little Pony: Equestria Girls
2017 television specials
Equestria Girls films
Animated crossover television specials
Discovery Family original programming